Aduyev (masculine) or Aduyeva (feminine) is a Russian last name. It is derived from the word "", used to mock the inhabitants of Odoyevsky Uyezd in Tula Governorate.

Fictional characters
Alexander Aduyev, main hero of A Common Story, a debut novel by Ivan Goncharov
Uzhakh Aduyev, character played by Alexey Serebryakov in the 2003 Russian movie Antikiller 2: Antiterror

Toponyms
Aduyeva, alternative name of Aduyevo, a village in Yermolinskoye Rural Settlement of Istrinsky District in Moscow Oblast;

See also
Aduyevo, several rural localities in Russia

References

Notes

Sources
Ю. А. Федосюк (Yu. A. Fedosyuk). "Русские фамилии: популярный этимологический словарь" (Russian Last Names: a Popular Etymological Dictionary). Москва, 2006. 



Russian-language surnames